A trencher (from Old French tranchier 'to cut') is a type of tableware, commonly used in medieval cuisine. A trencher was originally a flat round of (usually stale) bread used as a plate, upon which the food could be placed to eat. At the end of the meal, the trencher could be eaten with sauce, but could also be given as alms to the poor. Later the trencher evolved into a small plate of metal or wood, typically circular and completely flat, without the lip or raised edge of a plate. Trenchers of this type are still used, typically for serving food that does not involve liquid; for example, the cheeseboard.

In language

An individual salt dish or squat open salt cellar placed near a trencher was called a "trencher salt".

A "trencherman" is a person devoted to eating and drinking, often to excess; one with a hearty appetite, a gourmand. A secondary use, generally archaic, is one who frequents another's table, in essence a pilferer of another's food.

A "trencher-fed pack" is a pack of foxhounds or harriers in which the hounds are kept individually by hunt members and only assembled as a pack to hunt. Usually, a pack of hounds are maintained together as a pack in kennels.

Literature

In Virgil's Aeneid, trenchers are the object of a prophecy. In bk.3, Aeneas recounts to Dido how after a battle between the Trojans and the Harpies, Calaeno, chief of the Furies, prophesied to him (claiming to have the knowledge from Apollo) that he would finally arrive in Italy, but

Never shall you build your promised city
Until the injury you did us by this slaughter
Has brought you to a hunger so cruel
That you gnaw your very tables.

The prophecy is fulfilled in bk.7, when the Trojans eat the trenchers after a frugal feast. Aeneas' son Ascanius jokes that they are so hungry they would have eaten the tables, at which point Aeneas realises that the prophecy has been fulfilled. However, he reattributes the prophecy to his deceased father, Anchises:

I now can tell you, my father Anchises
Revealed these secrets to me for he said:
"When you have sailed, son, to an unknown shore
And, short of food, are driven to eat your tables,
Then, weary though you are, hope you are home

This episode is alluded to in Allen Tate's poem "The Mediterranean", although Tate calls them "plates".

The Middle Ages, Everyday Life in Medieval Europe by Jeffrey L. Singman (Sterling publishers) offers the following observation: "The place setting also included a trencher, a round slice of bread from the bottom or the top of an old loaf, having a hard crust and serving as a plate.  After the meal, the sauce-soaked trenchers were probably distributed to servants or the poor.  Food was served on platters, commonly one platter to two diners, from which they transferred it to their trenchers."

Shakespeare used the term in at least eleven of his plays.

The term appears frequently throughout George R.R. Martin's A Song of Ice and Fire series, such as this excerpt from A Dance with Dragons: "The beer was brown, the bread black, the stew a creamy white. She served it in a trencher hollowed out of a stale loaf."

See also

 Bread bowl
 Injera
 Edible tableware
 Frumenty
 Great hall
 Medieval cuisine
 Sop

References

Tableware
Breads
Medieval cuisine